Jan Ahmad (also Romanized as Jān Aḩmad) is a village in Chenarud-e Shomali Rural District, Chenarud District, Chadegan County, Isfahan Province, Iran. At the 2006 census, its population was 35, in 9 families.

References 

Populated places in Chadegan County